The 2013 World Men's Curling Championship (branded as the Ford World Men's Curling Championship 2013 for sponsorship reasons) was held from March 30 to April 7, 2013 at the Save-On-Foods Memorial Centre in Victoria, British Columbia, Canada. This marked the twenty-first time that Canada hosted the World Men's Championship, the fifth time that the province of British Columbia hosted the World Men's Championship, and the second time that Victoria hosted the World Men's Championship. Victoria previously hosted the championships in 2005. The event was also a qualifying event for the 2014 Winter Olympics, awarding points to countries based on performance at this tournament.

Qualification
The following nations qualified to participate in the 2013 World Men's Curling Championship:
 (host nation)
One team from the Americas zone
 (given that no challenges in the Americas zone were issued)
Eight teams from the 2012 European Curling Championships

 (winner of the World Challenge Games)
Two teams from the 2012 Pacific-Asia Curling Championships

Teams
The teams are listed as follows:

Notes
  Torger Nergård, who usually plays third, was not present at the Worlds due to the upcoming birth of his child, so Løvold, the team's longtime alternate, played in his place. Høiberg served as the alternate.

Round-robin standings
Final round-robin standings

Round-robin results
All draw times are listed in Pacific Daylight Time (UTC−7).

Draw 1
Saturday, March 30, 14:00

Draw 2
Saturday, March 30, 19:00

Draw 3
Sunday, March 31, 9:00

Draw 4
Sunday, March 31, 14:00

Draw 5
Sunday, March 31, 19:00

Draw 6
Monday, April 1, 9:00

Draw 7
Monday, April 1, 14:00

Draw 8
Monday, April 1, 19:00

Draw 9
Tuesday, April 2, 9:00

Draw 10
Tuesday, April 2, 14:00

Draw 11
Tuesday, April 2, 19:00

Draw 12
Wednesday, April 3, 8:30

Draw 13
Wednesday, April 3, 13:30

Draw 14
Wednesday, April 3, 19:00

Draw 15
Thursday, April 4, 9:00

Draw 16
Thursday, April 4, 14:00

Draw 17
Thursday, April 4, 19:00

Playoffs

1 vs. 2
Friday, April 5, 19:00

3 vs. 4
Saturday, April 6, 11:00

Semifinal
Saturday, April 6, 16:00

Bronze medal game
Sunday, April 7, 11:00

Gold medal game
Sunday, April 7, 16:00

Statistics

Top 5 player percentages
Round robin only

Perfect games
Round robin only

References
General

Specific

External links

World Men's Curling Championship
Sports competitions in Victoria, British Columbia
Qualification events for the 2014 Winter Olympics
World Men's Curling Championship
Curling in British Columbia
World Men's Curling Championship
World Men's Curling Championship
World Men's Curling Championship
21st century in Victoria, British Columbia